Alan Gutierrez (born 1958 in Kansas City, Missouri) is an artist and illustrator, specializing in science fiction and fantasy cover art. Gutierrez grew up in southern California, and he received his BFA  in illustration  from the Art Center College of Design in Pasadena in 1982.  His first professional sale was to Fantasy Book in 1983. He then began painting covers for Tor Books, Baen Books and other publishers. Gutierrez has also painted covers for  Analog magazine, Asimov's Science Fiction, and other SF magazines. As of mid-2014, he is credited with 156 book and magazine covers at the Internet Speculative Fiction Database. His works have been nominated for several awards.

References

External links
Artist's home page and gallery

1958 births
Art Center College of Design alumni
Artists from California
Fantasy artists
Living people
Artists from Kansas City, Missouri
Role-playing game artists
Science fiction artists
American speculative fiction artists